The Life Lottery, a futuristic eco-thriller, is the final book in Ian Irvine's Human Rites Sequence, set after the events in Terminator Gene. It is also only published in Australia.

Titles of the Human Rites Sequence 
 The Last Albatross (November 2000)
 Terminator Gene (April 2003)
 The Life Lottery (August 2004)

Plot summary 
Irith Hardey's life is out of control.

The world's climate is in chaos. Rising seas have flooded out half a billion people. Hundreds of millions of refugees are pouring into the west, the global economy is collapsing and democracies are being crushed by the anti-refugee Yellow Armbands. But there is worse to come. In a desperate attempt to avert the coming ice age that will wipe out civilisation, the Great Powers have agreed to embark on the most monumental gamble of all time 100 Days to Save the World.

Climate scientist Irith Hardey is sure they've got it wrong.  The U.S. President's pet scheme isn't going to save the world, but ruin it. Searching for the awful truth behind the 100 Days project, Irith is tormented by the Yellow Armbands, then hunted from blizzard-struck London to the Scottish Highlands and across the wild North Sea.

In a United States terrorized by gun-toting militias trying to bring down the President, Irith is forced to confront the worst nightmare any 21st-century woman can face, as she struggles to uncover the ghastly secret of the Life Lottery before 100 days are up.

Publishers 
 Simon & Schuster Australia
 Mobipocket

External links 
 Interview with Ian Irvine on the Australian Broadcasting Corporation

See also 
Clathrate gun hypothesis

References 

Novels by Ian Irvine
2004 novels
2004 science fiction novels
Australian science fiction novels